Galib Malik oglu Israfilov (born May 9, 1975) is an Azerbaijani diplomat currently serving as Azerbaijan's Permanent Representative to the United Nations. He previously served as Azerbaijan Ambassador to Austria, Slovenia and Slovakia.

Education 
Israfilov obtained a degree in International Relations from Baku State University, Azerbaijan in 1996 and secured an advanced degree in International Relations from Georgetown University, Washington D.C., United States in 1997.

Career 
Israfilov started his diplomatic career in 1996 at the Ministry of Foreign Affairs and rose through the ranks to the position of Deputy Director of the Department of Security Affairs in 2007. He was appointed Permanent Representative of Azerbaijan to the Organization for Security and Cooperation in Europe in 2011 and served as Azerbaijan Ambassador to Austria, Slovenia and Slovakia. He was recalled from these missions and other foreign assignments at the Organization for Security and Cooperation in Europe (OSCE), the UN Industrial Development Organization, the International Atomic Energy Agency and the Comprehensive Nuclear-Test-Ban Treaty Organization (CTBT) in July 2021. He was appointed Azerbaijan Permanent Representative to the United Nations and presented his letter of credence on 24 August 2021.

References 

Living people
1975 births
Azerbaijani diplomats
Baku State University alumni
Georgetown University alumni
Permanent Representatives of Azerbaijan to the United Nations
Ambassadors of Azerbaijan to Austria
Ambassadors of Azerbaijan to Slovenia
Ambassadors of Azerbaijan to Slovakia